Ahmed Mekkawi (5 March 1923 – 5 April 1996) was an Egyptian footballer. He competed at the 1948 Summer Olympics and the 1952 Summer Olympics.

References

External links
 
 

1923 births
1996 deaths
Egyptian footballers
Egypt international footballers
Olympic footballers of Egypt
Footballers at the 1948 Summer Olympics
Footballers at the 1952 Summer Olympics
People from Sharqia Governorate
Association football forwards
Mediterranean Games silver medalists for Egypt
Mediterranean Games medalists in football
Footballers  at the 1951 Mediterranean Games
Al Ahly SC players